= Isotropic helicoid =

Helical shape with equal rotation and drag in all orientations

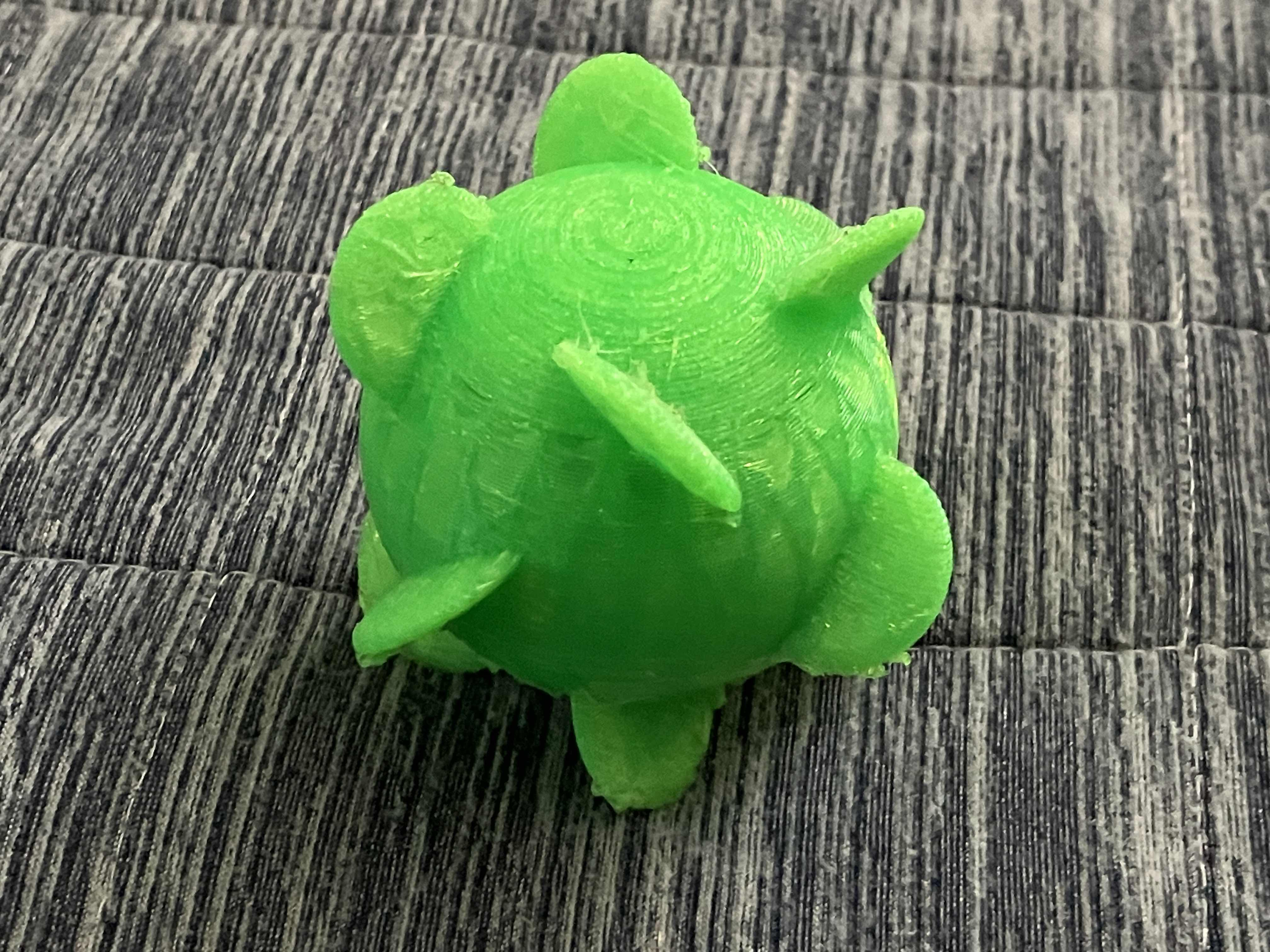
A green, 3D printed isotropic helicoid, roughly 3 inches (7.6 cm) in diameter

In fluid dynamics, an isotropic helicoid is a shape that is helical, so it rotates as it moves through a fluid, and yet is isotropic, so that its rotation and drag are the same for all orientations of the particle. It was first proposed by Lord Kelvin in 1871, who described a specific geometry with twelve vanes placed around a sphere. As of 2021, such a phenomenon has yet to be proven by researchers.
